"Where Are You Going" is the first single from Dave Matthews Band's album Busted Stuff. The single reached number 39 on the Billboard Hot 100, number 20 on the Modern Rock Tracks, and topped the Triple A chart. The song was featured in the 2002 Adam Sandler motion picture, Mr. Deeds. It is also featured in the trailer for the 2008 film Flash of Genius. "Where Are You Going" is one of two songs from Busted Stuff that did not originally appear on The Lillywhite Sessions.

Track listing
"Where Are You Going" (album version) – 3:52
"Where Are You Going" (edit) – 3:46

Charts

Weekly charts

Year-end charts

References

2002 singles
Dave Matthews Band songs
Songs written by Dave Matthews
Rock ballads
2002 songs
RCA Records singles